The New Danube (German Neue Donau) is a side channel built in 1972–88 on the eastern side of the Danube in Vienna, Austria. It was created to provide flood relief by containing excess water. The Donauinsel (Danube Island), made out of the removed material, separates the new waterway from the main channel of the river. The project was referred to by the United Nations Human Settlements Programme (UN-HABITAT) as "the first truly multipurpose fully sustainable flood protection scheme."

The New Danube flows parallel to the river for approximately  through the Vienna metropolitan area. It diverges from the main channel in Langenzersdorf in Lower Austria (northwest of the city), flows through the 21st district, and rejoins it at the Danube-Auen National Park in the 22nd district (in the southeast). The current course of the New Danube and the site of the Danube Island were previously a broad landscape of meadows set aside as a floodplain in the first effort to manage Danube floods, in 1868–75. The left, northern bank of the New Danube is protected by the Hubertus Dam (Marchfeld Protective Dam), completed in 1875.

Following disastrous flooding in Vienna in 1954, years of discussion led to a new plan for regulating the Danube involving creating a relief channel and a long barrier island. Construction began in 1972 and was completed only in 1988.

At the beginning of the New Danube is a weir known as the influx building (Einlaufbauwerk), which is normally closed, making the New Danube a still body of water. When the Danube rises, it is opened to relieve pressure on the river and prevent flooding. This usually leads to a ban on swimming in the New Danube lasting for as long as several weeks, until the water quality improves. Further weirs are located just upstream of the Prater Bridge (Weir 1) and on the level of the Lobau oil terminal (Weir 2), approximately  before the New Danube rejoins the main channel.

The New Danube can be reached via U-Bahn lines U6 (Neue Donau station), U1 (Donauinsel station) and U2 (Donaustadtbrücke station), via tram line 31 across the Floridsdorf Bridge, and via various city bus lines. It has stretches suitable for regattas—in September 2009 the World Rowing Masters Regatta took place there—and a waterski lift. The best known stretch of shoreline is the Copa Cagrana, next to the Reichsbrücke. Private motorboats are not permitted on the New Danube.

It has been described as an "autobahn for swimmers", due to its use by people to commute around the city.

See also
A series of articles on regulation of the Danube in chronological order
Internationalization of the Danube River, for events from earliest times to the Treaty of Paris in 1856
Commissions of the Danube River, for the international bodies governing the waterway from 1856 to 1940
Nazi rule over the Danube River
Danube River Conference of 1948
Danube Commission, for events since 1948
International Commission for the Protection of the Danube River, for the organization established in 1998 and charged with environmental and ecological activities

References

External links
 Plan of New Danube and Danube Island, City of Vienna (German)

Flood control projects
Geography of Vienna
Danube